Naa Bolinaa Saaka is a Ghanaian diplomat and a member of the New Patriotic Party of Ghana. He is currently Ghana's ambassador to Burkina Faso.

Ambassadorial appointment 
In July 2017, President Nana Akuffo-Addo named Naa Bolinaa Saaka as Ghana's ambassador to Burkina Faso. He was among twenty two other distinguished Ghanaians who were named to head various diplomatic Ghanaian mission in the world.

References

Year of birth missing (living people)
Living people
Ambassadors of Ghana to Burkina Faso
21st-century diplomats